Shenshou is a genus of haramiyidan dating from the Oxfordian stage of the Late Jurassic, approximately 160 million years ago.  Fossils were recovered from the Tiaojishan Formation in the Liaoning province of China.

Etymology
The generic name is derived from Mandarin (神獸 shénshòu) shen, meaning deity, and shou, meaning animal, while the specific name is in reference to  Lu Jianhua, the scientist who collected the holotype specimen.

Description
Shenshou is thought to be arboreal because it had a light frame, a prehensile and elongated tail, and hands and feet which had evolved for clutching and enabled the animal to climb. These features, including the large incisors of Shenshou, made the animal resemble a squirrel. However, Shenshou are not the direct ancestors of squirrels, the resemblance being purely due to convergent evolution. The presence of a three-boned middle ear suggests these animals were mammals; however, it has since been determined haramiyidans developed their ear bones independently from true mammals and are Mammaliaformes outside of the mammal crown-group. The teeth, which have a number of cusps, suggest that Shenshou was probably an omnivore, most likely with a diet of fruits, nuts and insects.

References

Euharamiyids
Prehistoric cynodont genera
Late Jurassic synapsids of Asia
Prehistoric animals of China
Fossil taxa described in 2014
Prehistoric monotypic mammal genera
Taxa named by Shundong Bi
Taxa named by Yuanqing Wang
Taxa named by Jian Guan
Taxa named by Xia Sheng
Taxa named by Jin Meng